Anthelephila is a genus of beetles belonging to the family Anthicidae.

The species of this genus are found in Old World and Australia.

Species:

Anthelephila abnormis 
Anthelephila ailani 
Anthelephila akela 
Anthelephila alamea 
Anthelephila angustata 
Anthelephila arcana 
Anthelephila ayutthaya 
Anthelephila baeri 
Anthelephila banhuaipo 
Anthelephila bannape 
Anthelephila bifida 
Anthelephila bimaculatipennis 
Anthelephila bolavensis 
Anthelephila bramina 
Anthelephila caeruleipennis 
Anthelephila canaliculata 
Anthelephila davita 
Anthelephila disparilis 
Anthelephila falcata 
Anthelephila fallax 
Anthelephila feminea 
Anthelephila fossicollis 
Anthelephila fuscipes 
Anthelephila hauseri 
Anthelephila hispanica 
Anthelephila imperator 
Anthelephila imperatrix 
Anthelephila insolita 
Anthelephila ionica 
Anthelephila jelineki 
Anthelephila keahi 
Anthelephila keilana 
Anthelephila klapperichi 
Anthelephila kubani 
Anthelephila laopako 
Anthelephila latro 
Anthelephila lewisi 
Anthelephila maindroni 
Anthelephila multiformis 
Anthelephila nadari 
Anthelephila nandi 
Anthelephila nemrod 
Anthelephila ninus 
Anthelephila panayensis 
Anthelephila parallela 
Anthelephila paucula 
Anthelephila pedestris 
Anthelephila persica 
Anthelephila provecta 
Anthelephila sahyadrica 
Anthelephila sauteri 
Anthelephila semistrigosa 
Anthelephila simoni 
Anthelephila soror 
Anthelephila strigosa 
Anthelephila theravada 
Anthelephila triplex 
Anthelephila wanika 
Formicomus flavicornis

References

Anthicidae